Drežnica is a village in Croatia near the town of Ogulin. During the SFR Yugoslavia era, it was known as Partizanska Drežnica due to the village having a Yugoslav Partisan base during the Second World War.

History
Serbs migrated to Drežnica in the 17th century. In 1827, there was a parish at the Gomirje Monastery, served by Fr. Simeon Radulović. In 1842, an Orthodox church called the Church of the Nativity of the Theotokos was built. During World War II, it was burned, but it has since been restored. Mijat Stojanović wrote that the landscape in Drežnica is "very rocky, but there is beautiful forest and fertile land."

During World War II in Drežnica, there was a strong People's Liberation Movement with the headquarters of the General Staff of Croatia and Partisan hospital no. 7 established in 1942. People from Kordun, Banija, Lika, Žumberak and Slovenia were treated there. There is a memorial ossuary located there today as during the war, Drežnica had over 1000 casualties.

Population
According to the 2011 census, Drežnica had 516 inhabitants.

Notable people
 NBA player Pete Maravich's paternal grandparents immigrated from Drežnica to the United States.

References

Populated places in Karlovac County